Eri Yanetani (born 7 June 1984 in Kobe) is a Japanese snowboarder.

Yanetani competed in the women's parallel giant slalom event at the 2006 Winter Olympics, placing 18th, and the 2010 Winter Olympics, placing 21st.

At the 2017 Asian Winter Games she won a silver medal in the slalom event and a gold medal in the giant slalom event.

References

1984 births
Living people
Japanese female snowboarders
Olympic snowboarders of Japan
Snowboarders at the 2006 Winter Olympics
Snowboarders at the 2010 Winter Olympics
Asian Games medalists in snowboarding
Snowboarders at the 2003 Asian Winter Games
Snowboarders at the 2017 Asian Winter Games
Asian Games gold medalists for Japan
Asian Games silver medalists for Japan
Medalists at the 2017 Asian Winter Games
Sportspeople from Kobe
21st-century Japanese women